The Ruston Academy was a bilingual American school founded in Havana, Cuba, in 1920.

History
Opened in September 1920 in Havana by educator Hiram Ruston, The Ruston Academy was considered the premiere American school in Latin America. Originally focused on providing an English college-preparatory education for the children of American expatriates in Cuba, it quickly grew into a bilingual academy with a multinational student body. In the 1940s, Ruston expanded to include an elementary school, business preparatory program, basic English classes for Cuban students, and a boarding school, with enrollment measuring at roughly 750 students. In 1955 Ruston moved to a new, larger campus in Havana.

The school was founded by retired English teacher Hiram Hall Ruston and his sister Martha Ruston, of Princeton, Indiana. Mr. Ruston served as headmaster from 1920 to his death in 1946, after which James Baker took over the school's administration. James and his wife Sibyl inherited ownership of the school and converted it into an educational non-profit foundation. Ruston Academy was closed down by the Castro government in 1961. Its former location was used as a public school, storage facility, homeless shelter, and military intelligence facility by the Cuban government.

The Ruston-Baker Educational Institution (RBEI) was founded in 1992 by James Baker and former members of the Ruston Academy Board of Directors, with the goal of reopening Ruston Academy following the collapse of the Castro government. The RBEI maintains a network of alumni located across the globe. Sibyl Baker died in 1993 and James Baker died in 2001.

Notes and references

External links

 The Ruston Academy records are available at the Cuban Heritage Collection, University of Miami Libraries. The Ruston Academy Records contain materials related to the Ruston Academy. It also contains the administrative files of the Ruston-Baker Educational Institution, Inc. Other materials include photographs, programs, directories and correspondence documenting the history of Ruston Academy alumni reunions held in the United States from 1975 to 2012.
 The Ruston Academy yearbooks from 1940 to 1960, ephemera and photographs of the school and school functions, school publications, and photographs from alumni reunions are available through the University of Miami Digital Collections portal.

Education in Havana
1920 establishments in Cuba
Educational institutions established in 1920
Boarding schools in Cuba
Bilingual education
Bilingualism
1961 disestablishments in Cuba
Educational institutions disestablished in 1961